Jack Connors may refer to:

Jack Connors (footballer, born 1927) (1927–2006), English football wing half for Darlington
Jack Connors (footballer, born 1994), football defender for Dagenham & Redbridge and Ireland under-21

See also
John Connors (1830–1857), Victoria Cross recipient
John Connor (disambiguation)
Jack Connor (disambiguation)